Habig is a surname. Notable people with the surname include:

Ernst-Günter Habig (1935–2012), German football player, father of Günter
Günter Habig (born 1964), German football player
Jannie Habig, South African rally driver
Neil Habig (born 1936), Canadian football player